C44 may refer to:
 C-44 Canal in Florida
 C44 road (Namibia)
 Canada Business Corporations Act, Bill C-44 of the Parliament of Canada
 Channel 44 (Adelaide), an Australian community television station
 Citroën C44, a French prototype military vehicle based on the Volkswagen Iltis jeep
 , a Fiji-class cruiser of the Royal Navy
 Messerschmitt C-44, a German sport and touring aircraft purchased by the United States Army Air Corps 
 Scotch Game, a chess opening
 Skin cancer
 Toutant Airport in Woodstock Valley, Connecticut